Pteridaceae is a family of ferns in the order Polypodiales, including some 1150 known species in ca 45 genera (depending on taxonomic opinions), divided over five subfamilies.  The family includes four groups of genera that are sometimes recognized as separate families: the adiantoid, cheilanthoid, pteridoid, and hemionitidoid ferns. Relationships among these groups remain unclear, and although some recent genetic analyses of the Pteridales suggest that neither the family Pteridaceae nor the major groups within it are all monophyletic, as yet these analyses are insufficiently comprehensive and robust to provide good support for a revision of the order at the family level.

Description 

Members of Pteridaceae have creeping or erect rhizomes. The leaves are almost always compound and have linear sori that are typically on the margins of the leaves and lack a true indusium, typically being protected by a false indusium formed from the reflexed margin of the leaf.

Taxonomy

Traditional groups

As traditionally defined, the groups within Pteridaceae are as follows:

 Adiantoid ferns (tribe Adianteae ); epipetric, terrestrial or epiphytic in moist habitats, rachis often dichotomously branching; sori relatively small and discrete with sporangia born on the false indusium rather than the leaf blade proper; only one genus:
 Adiantum L. – maidenhair ferns
 Cheilanthoid ferns; primarily epipetric in semiarid habitats; leaves mostly with well-developed scales or trichomes, often bipinnate or otherwise highly compound; sporangia mostly born in marginal sori with false indusia that are +/- continuous around the leaf margins; several genera, including:
 Argyrochosma (J.Sm.) Windham – false cloak ferns
 Aspidotis (Nutt. ex Hook.) Copel. – lace ferns
 Astrolepis D.M.Benham & Windham – cloak ferns
 Cheilanthes Sw. – lip ferns
 Myriopteris Fée – lace lip ferns
 Notholaena R.Br. – cloak ferns
 Pellaea Link – cliff brakes
 Pteridoid ferns (tribe Pterideae ); terrestrial and epipetric in moist habitats; leaves mostly without prominent scales or trichomes, most often pinnate but sometimes more compound; sporangia born in marginal sori with false indusia that are +/- continuous around the leaf margins; several genera, including:
 Pteris L. – brakes
 Onychium Kaulf.
 Parkerioid ferns (tribe Parkerieae ); aquatic in swamps and/or mangroves, including:
 Acrostichum L. – leather ferns
 Ceratopteris Brongn.
 Hemionitidoid ferns; terrestrial, epipetric or epiphytic in moist or semiarid habitats; leaves simple, pinnate, or more compound; sporangia born in linear non-marginal, exindusiate sori or sometimes in marginal sori; several genera, including:
 Anogramma Link
 Cryptogramma R.Br. – rock brakes
 Eriosorus Fée
 Hemionitis L.
 Jamesonia Hook. & Grev.
 Pityrogramma Link – gold ferns
 Vittarioid ferns (tribe Vittarieae ); primarily epiphytic in tropical regions and all have simple leaves with sori that follow the veins and lack true indusia:
 Anetium 
 Antrophyum 
 Hecistopteris 
 Monogramma 
 Vittaria  – Shoestring fern

Subfamilies
Based on phylogenetic research, Christenhusz et al. (2011) divided the Pteridaceae genera into five subfamilies. These roughly correspond with the groups listed above, with the main difference being that adiantoid and vittarioid ferns are combined under the Vittarioideae subfamily name. The approach was followed by the Pteridophyte Phylogeny Group classification of 2016 (PPG I).

 Cryptogrammoideae 

Genera: Coniogramme, Cryptogramma, Llavea

 Parkerioideae 

Genera: Acrostichum, Ceratopteris

 Pteridoideae 
Genera: Actiniopteris, Anogramma, Austrogramme, Cerosora, Cosentinia, Gastoniella, Jamesonia (incl. Eriosorus and Nephopteris), Onychium, Pityrogramma, Pteris (incl. Neurocallis & Platyzoma), Pterozonium, Syngramma, Taenitis, Tryonia

 Cheilanthoideae 

Genera: Adiantopsis, Aleuritopteris, Allosorus, Argyrochosma, Aspidotis, Astrolepis, Bommeria, Calciphilopteris, Cheilanthes, Cheiloplecton, Doryopteris, Gaga, Hemionitis, Lytoneuron, Mildella, Myriopteris, Notholaena, Ormopteris, Paragymnopteris, Parahemionitis, Pellaea, Pentagramma, Trachypteris

 Vittarioideae 

Genera: Adiantum, Ananthacorus, Antrophyopsis, Antrophyum, Haplopteris, Hecistopteris, Polytaenium, Radiovittaria, Rheopteris, Scoliosorus, Vaginularia, Vittaria

Phylogenic relationships
Smith et al. (2006) carried out the first higher-level pteridophyte classification published in the molecular phylogenetic era. Smith referred to the ferns as monilophytes, dividing them into four groups. The vast majority of ferns were placed in the Polypodiopsida.

In 2016, the Pteridophyte Phylogeny Group divided order Polypodiales into six suborders. Pteridaceae is the sole family in suborder Pteridiineae, with 52 genera. The suborder has the same circumscription as Smith et al. used for the family. The phylogenetic relationship between these six suborders is shown in this cladogram:

The oldest fossil of the family is Heinrichsia from the early Late Cretaceous (Cenomanian) aged Burmese amber of Myanmar, which cannot be assigned to modern grouping of the family. Molecular clock evidence suggests a diversification of the family during the Late Cretaceous.

Phylogeny of Pteridaceae.

Distribution and habitat 

Mostly terrestrial or epipetric (growing on rock).

References

Bibliography

 
 
 
 
 
 
 
 
 
 
 
 , in 
 Eric Schuettpelz. The evolution and diversification of epiphytic ferns. PhD Thesis Duke University 2007
 Michael Hassler and Brian Swale. Checklist of Ferns and Fern Allies 2001
 Australian National Botanic Gardens. A classification of the ferns and their allies

External links
Tree of Life: Pteridaceae

 
Fern families
Polypodiales